Nadia Hijab, is a Palestinian political analyst, author, and journalist who comments frequently on human rights and the Middle East, and the situation of the Palestinians in particular.

Biography
Hijab was born in Aleppo, Syria to Palestinian Arab parents, Wasfi Hijab and Abla Nashif, but grew up in neighboring Lebanon, where she earned a BA and MA in English Literature from the American University of Beirut. During her years of study in Beirut, Hijab worked as a journalist, but she left Lebanon after the onset of the Lebanese Civil War. She traveled first to Qatar, and then to London, England, where she became the editor-in-chief of Middle East Magazine and appeared frequently in the media as a commentator on Middle East affairs.

In 1989, Hijab moved to the United States, where she worked for 10 years in New York City as a development specialist for the United Nations Development Programme. In 2000, she founded a consultancy firm, which she still heads.

In 2010, she co-founded Al-Shabaka, a virtual think tank bringing together close to 60 Palestinian thinkers and writers from all over the world. She is also a senior fellow at the Institute for Palestine Studies.

Books

 Womanpower: The Arab Debate on Women at Work, Cambridge U.P., 1988
 Citizens Apart: A Portrait of Palestinians in Israel, co-authored with Amina Minns, I.B. Tauris 1990

References

External links
 Profile of Nadia Hijab at the Institute for Middle East Understanding
 Nadia Hijab at the Council on Foreign Relations
 Columbia University – Averting Maternal Death and Disability (AMDD) Program Team Members

Year of birth missing (living people)
Living people
American University of Beirut alumni
Syrian emigrants to the United States
Palestinian women writers
Women social scientists
21st-century Palestinian women writers
21st-century Palestinian writers
Palestinian political scientists
Lebanese people of Palestinian descent
Syrian people of Palestinian descent
Women political scientists